West Campus Field was a soccer-specific stadium located in Birmingham, Alabama, United States on the campus of the University of Alabama at Birmingham (UAB) that served as the home field for both the UAB Blazers men's and women's soccer teams. The 1,500-seat stadium, with an overall capacity of 2,500, was built in 1993. The largest men's soccer regular season crowd to ever see a game at the facility was 3,141 on August 27, 2011, to see the Blazers defeat the Clemson Tigers in their 2011 home opener.

The facility hosted the Conference USA Men's Soccer Tournament in 1999 and 2007.

References

Soccer venues in Alabama
UAB Blazers
Sports venues in Birmingham, Alabama
Sports venues completed in 1993
1993 establishments in Alabama